Fortress of Justinian or simply known as Tirana Castle (Albanian: Kalaja e Tiranës) is a castle in Tirana, Albania. Its history dates back before 1300 and is a remnant from the Byzantine-era. The fortress is the place where the main east–west and north–south roads crossed, and formed the heart of Tirana. The current fortification has three known towers and it is undergoing a process of restoration, for touristic purposes. Inside the fortified walls of the former fortress, there are many buildings that can be visited, including restaurants, hotels, and cultural institutions.

The recently uncovered wall foundations were incorporated into the pedestrianised Murat Toptani Street, while a mosaic commemorating the 100th Anniversary of Albania's Independence was unveiled near the Albanian Parliament.

The Castle of Tirana was declared a monument of culture of first category on 10 June 1973 and the new tracks of walls of Tirana Castle were declared a cultural monument on 15 May 2008.

Traditional bazaar
In December 2018, a new traditional bazaar was opened inside Tirana Castle with various traditional hand crafts stores and traditional cuisine restaurants.

References

Castles in Albania
Cultural Monuments of Albania
Tourist attractions in Tirana
Byzantine forts
Buildings and structures in Tirana